Taulant Sefgjinaj (born 21 July 1986) is an Albanian football player who plays for KF Korabi Peshkopi. He is a defender whose main position is left back.

Honours
KF Laçi
 Albanian Cup (2): 2012–13, 2014–15

References

External links

 Profile - FSHF

1986 births
Living people
People from Laç
Association football fullbacks
Albanian footballers
KF Laçi players
KF Teuta Durrës players
KF Erzeni players
KS Kastrioti players
KS Burreli players
KF Korabi Peshkopi players
Kategoria Superiore players
Kategoria e Parë players